Hans Christian Hanssen-Fossnæs (9 October 1829 - 28  June 1890) was a Norwegian farmer and politician with the Conservative Party.

Hanssen-Fossnæs was born at Stokke in Vestfold, Norway.  He grew up on the  Kroken farm in Ske parish. He later acquired the Fossnes farm in Arnadal parish, which included a grain mill,  sawmill and brickyard.

He was elected to the Norwegian Parliament in 1883, representing the constituency of Jarlsberg og Larviks amt (now Vestfold), serving one term.

References

1829 births
1890 deaths
Members of the Storting
Conservative Party (Norway) politicians
Vestfold politicians
Norwegian farmers